{{Infobox person
| name          = Protap Chunder Majoomdar
| image         = The World's Parliament of Religions - an illustrated and popular story of the World's First Parliament of Religions, held in Chicago in connection with the Columbian exposition of 1893 (1893) (14762059301).jpg
| alt           = 
| caption       = 
| birth_name    = 
| birth_date    =  2 Oct 1840
| birth_place   = Bansberia, Bengal Presidency, British India (present-day Hooghly District, West Bengal, India)<ref name = "Bose290">Sengupta, Subodh Chandra and Bose, Anjali (editors), (1976), Samsad Bangali Charitabhidhan (Biographical dictionary), p 290</ref>
| death_date    =  21 May 1905
| death_place   = Calcutta, Bengal Presidency, British India
| resting_place = 
| occupation    = Writer, Religious Leader
| nationality   = Bengali
| citizenship   = 
| education     = 
| alma_mater    = 
| awards        = 
}}

Protap Chunder Mozoomdar ( Protap Chôndro Mojumdar, also transliterated as Pratap Chander Mozoomdar) (2 Oct 1840–21 May 1905) was a leader of the Hindu reform movement, the Brahmo Samaj, in Bengal, India, and a close follower of Keshub Chandra Sen. He was a leading exemplar of the interaction between the philosophies and ethics of Hinduism and Christianity, about which he wrote in his book, The Oriental Christ.

Life and work
Sen and his colleagues agreed that four Brahmos would study and report on the relationship between Brahmo ideals and the four major world religions (Hinduism, Christianity, Buddhism and Islam). Gour Govinda Ray was deputed to examine Hinduism; Aghore Nath Gupta, Buddhism and Girish Chandra Sen, Islam. Mozoomdar was deputed to study Christianity. His resulting book, The Oriental Christ, was published by Geo. H. Ellis in Boston in 1883. It was much discussed in the West, and eventually led to an important correspondence between Mozoomdar and Max Müller about the relationship between Hinduism and Christianity. After Mozoomdar published the correspondence it led to controversy in both Britain and India. Müller's efforts to get Mozoomdar to state openly that he was now a Christian were rejected by Mozoomdar, who argued that the label "Christian" did not properly articulate his own positive view of Jesus as a model of self-sacrifice, one whose actions and claims to divinity he interpreted from within the Brahmo philosophy. In turn Müller stated that Christians should learn from the Brahmos and should abandon the traditional Christian formulation of Atonement.

Mozoomdar also wrote several books about the spiritual and social ideals of the Brahmo movement and a biography of Sen, The Life and Teachings of Keshub Chunder Sen'' (1887). He also wrote a biography of Ramakrishna, of whom he expressed deep admiration. He attended the Parliament of the World's Religions in Chicago in 1893 as a delegate for the Brahmo Samaj.  In October 1893, Mozoomdar was elected a member of the American Antiquarian Society.

In 1919, the collected precepts of Protap Chunder Mazoomdar were published titled as 'Upadesh'. The writings of Mazoomdar reflects an outlook that freely acknowledges the value and fundamental affinity of different religions - including Christianity, Islam, or Judaism - and the religious figures associated with their origin and propagation.

References

Bibliography

External links
 
Article in the Telegraph of India, "Rote, Rhetoric and Identity - The ‘mixed bag’ quality of the colonial encounter, by Malavika Karlekar", 
"The oriental Christ" written by Protap Chunder Mozoomdar

19th-century Indian philosophers
1840 births
1905 deaths
19th-century Bengalis
Bengali writers
Brahmos
Bengali Hindus
20th-century Bengalis
Indian Christian writers
Members of the American Antiquarian Society
Scholars from West Bengal
Hindu philosophers and theologians
19th-century Hindu philosophers and theologians
Indian theologians
Indian religious writers
19th-century Indian writers